Milne Block is an historic building in Victoria, British Columbia, Canada, located at 546-548 Johnson Street, just west of Wharf Street.

See also
 List of historic places in Victoria, British Columbia

References

External links
 

1891 establishments in Canada
Buildings and structures completed in 1891
Buildings and structures in Victoria, British Columbia